Pretend is the debut studio album by Swedish singer and songwriter Seinabo Sey, released on 23 October 2015 by Universal Sweden. It was produced by Magnus Lidehäll. The album features the singles "Younger", "Hard Time" and "Pretend".

Track listing

Charts

Weekly charts

Year-end charts

References

2015 debut albums
Seinabo Sey albums
European Border Breakers Award-winning albums